The 1913 Atlantic hurricane season was the third consecutive year with a tropical cyclone developing before June. Although no "hurricane season" was defined at the time, the present-day delineation of such is June 1 to November 30. The first system, a tropical depression, developed on May 5 while the last transitioned into an extratropical cyclone on October 30. Of note, the seventh and eighth cyclones existed simultaneously from August 30 to September 4.

Of the season's ten tropical cyclones, six became tropical storms and four strengthened into hurricanes. Furthermore, none of these strengthened into a major hurricane—Category 3 or higher on the modern-day Saffir–Simpson hurricane wind scale—marking the sixth such occurrence since 1900. That system left five deaths and at least $4 million in damage in North Carolina. The first hurricane of the season also caused one fatality in Texas, while damage in South Carolina from the fifth hurricane reached at least $75,000.

The season's activity was reflected with an accumulated cyclone energy (ACE) rating of 36, below the 1911–1920 average of 58.7. ACE is a metric used to express the energy used by a tropical cyclone during its lifetime. Therefore, a storm with a longer duration will have high values of ACE. Thus, tropical depressions are not included here.

Timeline

Systems

Hurricane One 

Weather maps and ship data indicate the development of a tropical depression in the southwestern Caribbean Sea around 06:00 UTC on June 21. Moving north-northwestward, the depression accelerated and intensified into a tropical storm on the following day. Thereafter, it continued north-northwestward and oscillated slightly in strength. The system made another landfall near Cancún, Quintana Roo, with winds of  late on June 25. After briefly crossing the Yucatan Peninsula, the cyclone emerged into the Gulf of Mexico and eventually began moving more to the west-northwest. The hurricane then curved northwestward and made landfall in Padre Island, Texas, at the same intensity around 01:00 UTC on June 28. After moving inland, the storm quickly weakened and dissipated over Val Verde County just under 24 hours later.

Impact in Central America and Mexico is unknown. The storm brought heavy rainfall to portions of South Texas. At Montell,  of precipitation fell in about 19 hours, while Uvalde observed  of rain in approximately 17 hours. The resultant flooding caused considerable damage to lowlands, houses, and stock. Additionally, communication by telegraph and telephone were cut-off for several days and traffic was interrupted due to inundated streets. One person drowned in Montell.

Tropical Storm Two 

The depression moved rapidly northeastward and intensified into a tropical storm on August 15. The remnants were promptly absorbed by a frontal boundary.

Tropical Storm Three 

Weather maps and ship data indicated a tropical depression formed near the west coast of Africa on August 26. Early the next day, the system strengthened into a tropical storm. It then tracked westward for several days, threatening the Lesser Antilles before turning north-northwestward on September 3. Eventually, the storm recurved to the northeast before beginning an eastward direction on September 7. The following morning, it peaked with maximum sustained winds of  – just shy of hurricane status. Thereafter, the cyclone moved northward to northwestward for the next few days.

Hurricane Four 

A tropical storm developed about halfway between Bermuda and the Bahamas at 12:00 UTC on August 30. The storm moved slowly north-northwestward and approached the East Coast of the United States. By September 1, it intensified into a Category 1 hurricane. Eventually, the hurricane curved to the northwest. Hours later, it made landfall near Cape Lookout at the same intensity. Shortly after moving inland, the system weakened to a tropical storm. By September 4, it deteriorated to a tropical depression before dissipating over northeastern Georgia.

The worst of the property damage occurred in the vicinity of New Bern and Washington. Large railroad bridges in both New Bern and Washington were washed away, as were many other small bridges. Many low-lying streets were inundated. The storm was considered "the worst in history" at Goldsboro. In Farmville, a warehouse collapsed, killing two people inside while three deaths occurred elsewhere in the state. Throughout North Carolina, numerous telegraph and telephone lines were damaged. Similarly, telegraph and telephone lined were downed in rural areas of Virginia. Small houses in Newport News, Ocean View, and Old Point were unroofed. Overall, this storm caused five fatalities and $4–5 million in damage.

Hurricane Five 

An extratropical cyclone developed offshore Rhode Island on October 2 and moved southeastward. After becoming tropical, the storm continued to move southwestward and approached the Southeastern United States. By October 7, it curved westward and began to intensify. The storm became a Category 1 hurricane around 06:00 UTC on October 8. By the evening of October 8, the cyclone weakened to a tropical storm and fell to tropical depression intensity by late on October 9. Early the following day, it became extratropical and was soon absorbed by a strong cold front over North Carolina.

The Georgetown Railway and Light Company and the Home Telephone Company suffered the worst damage. Throughout Georgetown, wires and poles were toppled, which briefly cut-off communications. Fences and trees limbs were also blown down. Precipitation led to minor crop damage, totaling approximately $75,000.

Hurricane Six 

Moving north-northeast, the storm reached Category 1 hurricane intensity about 24 hours after its classification. Around 06:00 UTC on October 29, the system made landfall near Cape San Antonio, Cuba, at the same intensity. After about six hours over Cuba, the hurricane weakened to a tropical storm. It transitioned into an extratropical cyclone in present-day Mayabeque Province before being absorbed by a frontal boundary shortly thereafter.

Other systems 
In addition to the six systems that reached tropical storm status, four other tropical depressions developed. The first formed northeast of Bermuda on May 5, marking the third consecutive year in which a tropical cyclone originated before June. The depression was absorbed by a frontal boundary on May 7. Another tropical depression developed in the Bay of Campeche on June 13. Drifting slowly northward and westward, the system made landfall in southern Texas on June 16 and dissipated the following day. The next tropical depression formed in the vicinity of the Azores on July 20. After four days, it was absorbed into a frontal system. The final cyclone that failed to tropical storm status developed in the northeastern Gulf of Mexico to the south of Tallahassee, Florida, on August 4. Drifting southwestward over the next few days, the depression dissipated by August 7.

See also 

 List of tropical cyclones
 Atlantic hurricane season
 1900–1940 South Pacific cyclone seasons
 1900–1950 South-West Indian Ocean cyclone seasons
 1910s Australian region cyclone seasons

References

External links 

 Monthly Weather Review

 
Articles which contain graphical timelines
1913 meteorology
1913 natural disasters